The 1986 Philippine Basketball Association (PBA) All-Filipino Conference was the second conference of the 1986 PBA season. It started on July 6 and ended on September 2. The tournament is an All-Filipino format, which doesn't require an import or a pure-foreign player for each team.

Format
The following format will be observed for the duration of the conference:
 Single-round robin eliminations; 6 games per team; Teams are then seeded by basis on win–loss records.
 Top two teams automatically advance to the semifinals. Next four teams will dispute in the last two semifinals berth in a one round-robin quarterfinals (results from the elimination will be carried over). 
 Semifinals will be two round robin affairs. The top two teams in the semifinals advance to the best of five finals. The last two teams dispute the third-place trophy in a best of five playoff.

Elimination round

Quarterfinal berth playoff

Quarterfinals

Semifinals

Third place playoffs

Finals

References

PBA Philippine Cup
All-Filipino Conference